Elsie Ward (also known as Elsie Ward Hering) (1871–1923) was an American sculptor born in Fayette, Missouri. Her collection largely consists of bronze and other metal sculptures. Ward worked on a host of diverse works of art, but "her specialty was portraits, busts, and reliefs".

Life 

Ward grew up on a farm where she first started experimenting with clay, modeling her pets and peers. After her family moved to Denver, Colorado around 1887, Ward graduated from high school in 1889 and began studying art with artists such as Preston Powers, Ida M. Stair, Samuel Richards and Henry Read. From the time she graduated high school until she moved again to New York, Ward was involved in the Denver Woman's Club, the Denver School of Fine Arts, the Denver Art Association, and the Denver Artists Club.

Career 
In New York, Ward joined the Art Student's League and studied under Augustus St. Gaudens, Daniel Chester French, and Siddons Mowbray. Around 1898, Ward traveled to Paris where she created the Boy and Frog sculpture that was later awarded a medal at the 1904 St. Louis Worlds Fair. Before moving back to Denver in 1900, Ward also entered a piece for an exhibition at the Society of American Artists in Paris.

At the request of her previous mentor, Augustus St. Gaudens, Ward began work at his studio in Cornish, New Hampshire. Ward produced a number of her works at this point in her life, including Mother and Child and The Huguenot, both prize-winning pieces in the Charleston Exposition in 1902. After her mentor, St. Gaudens died in 1907, Ward finished many of the pieces he was commissioned to create including the Baker Memorial in Mount Kisco, New York and a monument for Marcus A. Hanna in Cleveland, Ohio. Additionally, "Ward was responsible for much of the work on the sculpture, Seated Lincoln (1897-1906) and the Baker tomb (1906-7)."

Ward then moved back to Denver, Colorado and married her husband, Henry Hering, in 1910. After she married Henry, Elsie Ward took his last name and became Elsie Ward Hering. "After her marriage to Henry Hering in 1910, she seldom worked independently but assisted her husband on his projects."

Ward continued to create art pieces after leaving the St. Gaudens studio. One of her last known works is a baptismal font that was finished in 1917 and was erected in St. George's Church in New York City.  "Until her death in 1923, she was a deserving sculptor of statues great and small, including portraits and statues for public spaces." Following her death in Manhattan, New York in 1923, Ward was survived by her two siblings, Margaret and Ethelbert Ward as well as Major R.T. Ward of the United States army, Reverend Talbot Ward, and William F. Ward.

Works
Portrait reliefs of her Mother, Alice Talbot Ward, and others
Chapel of Our Saviour, Denver, Colorado
The Fountain of the Women's Christian Temperance Union, St. Louis, Missouri
Schermerhorn Memorial Font, Denver, Colorado
The Huguenot for the 1901-2 South Carolina Inter-State and West Indian Exposition.
Boy and Frog, 1904, This work won the bronze medal at the 1904 St. Louis Exposition and copies are located at both Brookgreen Gardens and the Denver Botanic Gardens.

 Statue of frontiersman, George Rogers Clark, 1904, for the Louisiana Purchase Exposition, that was later permanently erected in St. Louis.

References

1872 births
1923 deaths
People from Fayette, Missouri
American women sculptors
Sculptors from Missouri
Art Students League of New York alumni
20th-century American sculptors
20th-century American women artists
Sculptors from New York (state)